Environment Coastal & Offshore (ECO) is a multi-media publication focused on coastal and offshore environmental topics. Published nine times a year in print format and twice in digital format, each issue of ECO includes news, opinion and features. The magazine also includes a weekly digital news and a website. As of March 2016, ECO was distributed to over 19,000 readers, most of whom work in marine related occupations. Aside from direct mailed distribution, the ECO magazine is distributed at major ocean industry events in the United States, Canada, the United Kingdom, and European nations.

ECO is published by TSC Strategic in Stuart, Florida. It was founded in 2012 by Managing Editor Greg Leatherman and the first issue appeared in January 2013. Beginning in March 2018, the Senior Editor for all ECO media is Kira Coley.

ECO announced an official partnership with the Intergovernmental Oceanographic Commission (IOC) of United Nations Educational, Scientific and Cultural Organization (UNESCO) in October 2019.

References

External links
 ECO Magazine

Environmental magazines
Magazines established in 2013
Magazines published in Florida
Nine times annually magazines